Hengshui is a prefecture-level city in southern Hebei province, People's Republic of China, bordering Shandong to the southeast. At the 2010 census its population was 4,340,373 inhabitants whom 522,147 lived in the built-up (or metro) area made of Taocheng urban district. It is on the Beijing–Kowloon railway.

Administrative divisions

Education
Hengshui High School and Hengshui University are located in Hengshui.

Sights

The Harrison International Peace Hospital is located in Hengshui.  This comprehensive teaching and research hospital was named after Dr. Tillson Harrison, a martyr to the Chinese revolution.  Dr. Harrison, a Canadian, died in 1947 while transporting medical equipment and supplies.  Some of this equipment is on display in an exhibition room in the hospital.
The hospital uses both traditional Chinese medicine and modern western diagnostic and therapeutic technology.

The city is renowned as the centre for inside painting, mainly of small snuff bottles. Zhang Rucai was born in Hebei Province and since 1972, he started to learn the art of inside painting. In April 1996, he was conferred the title Master of Chinese Folk Arts & Crafts by UNESCO. The city has a fascinating museum and exhibition of the art of the inside painter - many complex paintings done on the inside of small snuff bottles as well as special larger pieces of glassware.

There is a Buddhist Temple on the outskirts of the city which is well worth a visit, as is the bridge in the old part of the city - one of the few remnants of the old town.

Geography and Climate

Air pollution
According to a survey made by "Global voices China" in February 2013, 7 cities in Hebei including Xingtai, Shijiazhuang, Baoding, Handan, Langfang, Hengshui and Tangshan, are among China's 10 most polluted cities.

Religion
Hengshui is the seat of the Catholic Diocese of Hengshui.

References

 
Cities in Hebei
Prefecture-level divisions of Hebei